The 2022–23 season was the 35th season in the existence of Gaziantep F.K. and the club's fourth consecutive season in the top flight of Turkish football. In addition to the domestic league, Gaziantep F.K. participated in this season's edition of the Turkish Cup. The season covers the period from 1 July 2022 to 30 June 2023.

On 12 February 2023, Gaziantep F.K. announced withdrawal from the league and the cup due to the 2023 Turkey–Syria earthquake, which widely hit its home city.

Players

First-team squad

Out on loan

Pre-season and friendlies

Competitions

Overall record

Süper Lig

League table

Results summary

Results by round

Matches 
The league schedule was released on 4 July.

Turkish Cup

References 

Gaziantep F.K.
Gaziantep F.K.